The Embassy of Moldova in Berlin is the diplomatic mission of Moldova to Germany, which also functions as the non-resident Moldovan embassy to Denmark.

Gallery

See also
 German–Moldovan relations
 List of diplomatic missions of Moldova

External links
 Embassy of Moldova in Berlin

References

Berlin
Moldova
Germany–Moldova relations